Sir William Webb Follett (2 December 179628 June 1845) was an English lawyer and politician who served as MP for Exeter (1835–1845). He served twice as Solicitor-General, in 1834-5 and 1841 and as Attorney-General in 1844. He was knighted in 1835. He was reputed to have been the "greatest advocate of the century".

Early life
Follett was born 2 December 1796 at Topsham in Devon, the eldest surviving son of ten children. His father was Captain Benjamin Follett, late 13th Regiment of Infantry, who had retired from the army in 1790 and gone into business as a timber merchant, and his mother was Ann Webb, daughter of John Webb, of Kinsale, Ireland. His younger brother was Brent Spencer Follett (1810–1887) QC, MP and his sister Elizabeth married Richard Bright.

Follett attended Exeter grammar school and was privately educated by Mr Hutchinson, the curate of Heavitree. In 1813, he matriculated at Trinity College, Cambridge, receiving a B.A. without honours in 1818 and an M.A. in 1830.

On 11 October 1830, Follett married Jane Mary Giffard, the eldest daughter of Sir Ambrose Hardinge Giffard (1771–1827) who was chief justice of British Ceylon. They had five sons and two daughters.

Career
He joined the Inner Temple in Michaelmas term 1814 and read in the chambers of Robert Bayly and Godfrey Sykes. He became a special pleader in 1821 and was called to the bar on 28 May 1824. He joined the western circuit in 1825, where his first notable case was Garnett v Ferrand.

In November 1828, he and Henry Brougham were briefed on the case of Rowe v Brenton and when Brougham became Lord Chancellor, he offered to make Follett a silk, but Follett declined. He had a large practice with the House of Lords and, when it was re-organised in 1833, the Privy Council of the United Kingdom.

In 1832, Follett ran to be a Member of Parliament for Exeter but was unsuccessful. Instead he served as recorder for Exeter from 1832 to 1834, when Sir Robert Peel formed his first administration. He became solicitor-general in November and thereafter was appointed a King's Counsel and received a knighthood.

On 6 January 1835, he was returned to parliament for Exeter with 1425 votes. He resigned with the ministry in April 1835. In 1837 and 1841, Follett was re-elected to Parliament. On the return of Peel to power in 1841 Follett was again appointed Solicitor-General on 6 September, and on 15 April 1844 he succeeded Sir Frederick Pollock as Attorney-General.

Follett never gave up his private practice. He was best known for defending James Brudenell, 7th Earl of Cardigan in 1841 after a duel with Captain Harvey Tuckett, and representing George Chapple Norton in an action against Lord Melbourne in 1836. His speech in the latter case was parodied in the Pickwick Papers (1837).

Death and legacy

Follett was first ill in December 1835 and April 1836. He collapsed in February 1839 and could not return to work until later that year. He collapsed again in April 1844 and he was compelled to relinquish legal practice and to visit the south of Europe to recuperate. He returned to England in March 1845, but the tuberculosis, with which he had previously been diagnosed, reasserted itself and he died at Croker's house, 9 Cumberland Terrace, Regent's Park, London on 28 June 1845. He was buried in the Temple Church in London on 4 July.

A statue of Follett executed by William Behnes was erected by subscription and placed in the north transept at Westminster Abbey. His marble bust by Edward Bowring Stephens exists in the Devon and Exeter Institution, Exeter.

References

External links 
 
 

1796 births
1845 deaths
Attorneys General for England and Wales
19th-century deaths from tuberculosis
English barristers
Tuberculosis deaths in England
Members of the Parliament of the United Kingdom for Exeter
Solicitors General for England and Wales
UK MPs 1835–1837
UK MPs 1837–1841
UK MPs 1841–1847
Knights Bachelor
Alumni of Trinity College, Cambridge
Members of the Inner Temple